Maurits (Maurice) Blieck (19 April 1913 in Bruges – 25 July 1977 in Bruges) was a Belgian football player. He used to be a forward.

Blieck made his debut at the highest level of Belgian football in the 1933-34 season, in a 4-0 home win against Tilleur. Blieck scored twice. In his next two seasons for Cercle Brugge, Blieck would become team top scorer. His son Roger would later also become top scorer twice for Cercle.

Roger Blieck moved to Eendracht Aalst in 1936, when Cercle were relegated to second division. Aalst were also playing at that level. After his two seasons at Aalst, Blieck played for SK Geraardsbergen, Club Roeselare, FC Torhout and SC Beernem.

External links
 Maurice Blieck at Cerclemuseum.be 

1913 births
1977 deaths
Belgian footballers
Association football forwards
Cercle Brugge K.S.V. players
Belgian Pro League players
Footballers from Bruges
S.C. Eendracht Aalst players
K.S.V. Roeselare players